The women's shot put event at the 2021 European Athletics Indoor Championships was held on 4 March at 19:15 (qualification) and 5 March at 19:06 (final) local time.

Medalists

Records

Results

Qualification
Qualification: Qualifying performance 18.40 (Q) or at least 8 best performers (q) advance to the Final.

Final

References

2021 European Athletics Indoor Championships
Shot put at the European Athletics Indoor Championships
European